The Sept-Îles Lighthouse is an active lighthouse in Perros-Guirec, (Côtes-d'Armor) France, located on the Île aux moines, an island of the Sept-Îles archipelago in the English Channel. The island is accessible, but the lighthouse is closed to the public.

History 
The first lighthouse, a round tower, was illuminated in May 1835, and then replaced in 1854 by a square tower 16 ft (5 m) taller.

Destroyed 4 August 1944, it was rebuilt in 1949 and relit in July 1952.

From 1957 onward, it has the used wind for electric power. The wind turbine is the most powerful in service of a French lighthouse.

The archipelago of Sept-Îles has been a bird sanctuary since 1912.

The Sept-Îles Lighthouse was one of the last French lighthouses to be de-manned, and only became automated at the end of August 2007.

See also 

 List of tallest lighthouses
 List of lighthouses in France

References

External links 

 
 Phares & Feux des côtes de France 
 
 

Lighthouses completed in 1835
Lighthouses completed in 1854
Lighthouses completed in 1952
Lighthouses in Brittany
Lighthouses of the English Channel
1835 establishments in France